The , sometimes abbreviated as TGC, is a semiannual fashion festival launched in 2005. It is mainly held near Tokyo area and some local cities such as Kitakyushu, Nagoya and Okinawa. The fashion event showcases the seasons fashionable streetwear by domestic brands. It was founded by Fumitaro Ohama.

The concept of TGC was an event displaying the wish and prayer for continued growth, prosperity  and developments in Asia, mainly in Japan after the world war.  The first show was produced by Ohama. In the later show, Ohama collaborated with Takashi Murakami, the contemporary artists, to bring fashion and art together in the show.

Most of those who walk in the TGC runway are muses for fashion brands, and many of them are not professional fashion models. Recently, as of 2012, actress Yumiko Shaku walked in the Spring-Summer TGC show as the muse for gyaru fashion brand "Rady" by Shizuka Mutoh, a model known for appearing in the Koakuma Ageha magazine.

The event is open not only to buyers and journalists, but also to the general public and incorporates live concerts by well-known artists, charity auctions as well as the Miss TGC Contest. The event is planned and sponsored by Branding Inc. (which runs girlswalker.com and fashionwalker.com) and the outfits donned by the models are made available for purchase on the spot through Fashionwalker's mobile site.

In June 2015, the event's license was purchased by the Japanese media company DLE (company) from Branding Inc. The first TGC to be organized by DLE was held on September 27, 2015. In July 2016, DLE took over complete control of TGC from Branding Inc., creating a new governing company, W Media.

Past venues 

: To expand to a wider audience the Tokyo Girls Collection will team up with the Shibuya Girls Collection and extend to a two-day event. The first day will host the 8th Tokyo Girls Collection while the second day will host the 3rd Shibuya Girls Collection.

References

External links 
 Tokyo Girls Collection - Official website

Fashion events in Japan
Japanese fashion
Japanese subcultures
Recurring events established in 2005
2005 establishments in Japan
Events in Tokyo
Annual events in Japan
Semiannual events